John Barrington-Ward (28 August 1928 – 4 July 2013) was a British sailor. He competed in the Dragon event at the 1952 Summer Olympics.

References

External links
 

1928 births
2013 deaths
British male sailors (sport)
Olympic sailors of Great Britain
Sailors at the 1952 Summer Olympics – Dragon
People from Hindhead